Silky Oak is a rural locality in the Cassowary Coast Region, Queensland, Australia. In the  Silky Oak had a population of 139 people.

History 
Silky Oak Creek State School opened on 1 November 1940 and closed on 31 December 1974.

In the  Silky Oak had a population of 139 people.

References 

Cassowary Coast Region
Localities in Queensland